Velammal College of Engineering and Technology is a private institution located in the temple city of Madurai, Tamil Nadu. It was established by the Velammal Educational Trust. The college was started in 2007 in Madurai to provide professional education to the students of south Tamil Nadu. (College Counselling Code: 5986)

History
Velammal College of Engineering and Technology was established by the Velammal Educational Trust. The Velammal Educational Trust was established in the year 1986 by Mr. M. V. Muthuramalingam. He is the chairman of the Velammal Educational Trust.

VCET was established in the academic year 2007-2008. It is a self-financing Non-Minority institution affiliated to the Anna University and approved by the All India Council for Technical Education(AICTE).

Courses Offered
VCET provides a total of 6 Under Graduate and 7 Post Graduate Programs. They are-

Under Graduate Programs
Civil Engineering
Computer Science and Engineering
Electronics and Communications Engineering
Electrical and Electronics Engineering
Information Technology
Mechanical Engineering

Post Graduate Programs
Communications Systems Engineering
Computer Science Engineering
Manufacturing Engineering
Network Engineering
Power Systems Engineering
Masters in Business Administration
Master in Computer Applications

Major Achievements

87.03% Pass Rate
73.49 Lakhs Funded Projects
102 paper Publications
7 patents received
80.84% Placement 
370 Offers
160 Companies Visited
99 IT & Product Companies Visted
61 Core Companies Visited
10.50 LPA - Highest Salary
3.99 LPA - Average Salary

Ranking
VCET ranked 2nd Top College in Madurai and  9th in TamilNadu and also 20th in India among private Engineering Colleges for 2021-2022 by Education World.

Campus
The Campus of Velammal College of Engineering and Technology is located in the village of Viraganoor nearby the Viraganoor Ring Road. The college is located 5 km away from Madurai city limits.

There are two main blocks in the college. They are
 Vivekananda Block 
This block houses all the departments and the class rooms along with seminar halls and Meeting halls. The Library of the college is also situated in this Block. It also houses the computer labs of IT and CSE Departments.
 LAB Block
This Block has the laboratory facilities. It also houses the Kamaraj A/C Auditorium.

References
       2. ^  http://vcet.ac.in/

Engineering colleges in Tamil Nadu
Engineering colleges in Madurai
Colleges in Madurai
Universities and colleges in Madurai
Science and technology in Madurai
Colleges affiliated to Anna University
Educational institutions established in 2007
2007 establishments in Tamil Nadu